Anna Maria Blom (born April 9, 1976) is a Swedish female curler.

She is a 1998 Swedish women's champion.

Teams

References

External links
 

Living people
1976 births
Sportspeople from Stockholm
Swedish female curlers
Swedish curling champions